Carl J. Rosenquist (born March 5, 1943) is an American politician in the state of Vermont. He is a member of the Vermont House of Representatives, sitting as a Republican from the Franklin-1 district, having been first elected in 2015.

References

1943 births
Living people
People from Georgia, Vermont
Temple University alumni
Republican Party members of the Vermont House of Representatives
21st-century American politicians